Tedania is a genus of sea sponges in the family Tedaniidae.

Species 
The following species are recognised in the genus Tedania:
 Subgenus Tedania (Stylotedania) Van Soest, 2017
 Tedania folium Van Soest, 2017
 Subgenus Tedania (Tedania) Gray, 1867
 Tedania anhelans (Vio in Olivi, 1792)
 Tedania assabensis Keller, 1891
 Tedania baeri Van Soest & Hooper, 2020
 Tedania battershilli Bergquist & Fromont, 1988
 Tedania bispinata Hentschel, 1911
 Tedania bowerbanki Van Soest & Hooper, 2020
 Tedania brasiliensis Mothes, Hajdu & van Soest, 2000
 Tedania brevispiculata Thiele, 1903
 Tedania brondstedi Burton, 1936
 Tedania chevreuxi Topsent, 1891
 Tedania commixta Ridley & Dendy, 1886
 Tedania conica Baer, 1906
 Tedania connectens (Brøndsted, 1924)
 Tedania coralliophila Thiele, 1903
 Tedania dirhaphis Hentschel, 1912
 Tedania diversirhaphidiophora Brøndsted, 1924
 Tedania elegans (Lendenfeld, 1888)
 Tedania fibrosa Ridley & Dendy, 1887
 Tedania flexistrongyla Koltun, 1959
 Tedania fragilis Lambe, 1895
 Tedania fulvum Aguilar-Camacho, Carballo & Cruz-Barraza, 2018
 Tedania galapagensis Desqueyroux-Faúndez & van Soest, 1996
 Tedaria ignis (Duchassaing & Michelotti, 1864)
 Tedania inermis Hentschel, 1911
 Tedania kagalaskai Lehnert, Stone & Heimler, 2006
 Tedania klausi Wulff, 2006
 Tedania levigotylota Hoshino, 1981
 Tedania livida Goodwin, Jones, Neely & Brickle, 2016
 Tedania macrodactyla (Lamarck, 1814)
 Tedania maeandrica Thiele, 1903
 Tedania murdochi Topsent, 1913
 Tedania obscurata (De Laubenfels, 1930)
 Tedania oligostyla de Laubenfels, 1954
 Tedania pacifica de Laubenfels, 1954
 Tedania palola Hoshino, 1981
 Tedania panis (Selenka, 1867)
 Tedania pilarriosae Cristobo, 2002
 Tedania placentaeformis Brøndsted, 1924
 Tedania polytyla Hentschel, 1911
 Tedania purpurescens Bergquist & Fromont, 1988
 Tedania reticulata Thiele, 1903
 Tedania rhoi Sim & Lee, 1998
 Tedania rubicunda Lendenfeld, 1888
 Tedania rudis (Bowerbank, 1875)
 Tedania sansibarensis Baer, 1906
 Tedania sasuensis Kim & Sim, 2005
 Tedania scotiae Stephens, 1915
 Tedania songakensis Kim & Sim, 2005
 Tedania spinostylota Bergquist & Fromont, 1988
 Tedania strongyla Li, 1986
 Tedania strongylostyla Kennedy & Hooper, 2000
 Tedania stylonychaeta Lévi, 1963
 Tedania suctoria Schmidt, 1870
 Tedania tepitootehenuaensis Desqueyroux-Faúndez, 1990
 Tedania toxicalis De Laubenfels, 1930
 Tedania tropicalis Aguilar-Camacho, Carballo & Cruz-Barraza, 2018
 Tedania tubulifera Lévi, 1963
 Tedania urgorrii Cristobo, 2002
 Tedania verrucosa Carter, 1886
 Tedania vulcani Lendenfeld, 1897
 Subgenus Tedania (Tedaniopsis) Dendy, 1924
 Tedania armata Sarà, 1978
 Tedania aurantiaca Goodwin, Brewin & Brickle, 2012
 Tedania charcoti Topsent, 1907
 Tedania corticata Sarà, 1978
 Tedania cristagalli Dendy, 1924
 Tedania gracilis Hentschel, 1914
 Tedania gurjanovae Koltun, 1958
 Tedania infundibuliformis Ridley & Dendy, 1886
 Tedania laminariae Sarà, 1978
 Tedania lanceta Koltun, 1964
 Tedania massa Ridley & Dendy, 1886
 Tedania mucosa Thiele, 1905
 Tedania oxeata Topsent, 1916
 Tedania phacellina Topsent, 1912
 Tedania sarai Bertolino, Schejter, Calcinai, Cerrano & Bremec, 2007
 Tedania tantula (Kirkpatrick, 1907)
 Tedania tenuicapitata Ridley, 1881
 Tedania triraphis Koltun, 1964
 Tedania turbinata (Dendy, 1924)
 Tedania vanhoeffeni Hentschel, 1914
 Tedania wellsae Goodwin, Brewin & Brickle, 2012
 Subgenus unassigned
 Tedania rubra Lendenfeld, 1888

References

External links 
 Tedania at WoRMS
 
 

Poecilosclerida
Sponge genera